Hopeworks 'N Camden is an American nonprofit founded in 2000 to assist Camden, New Jersey youths ages 14–25 to return to school and to achieve gainful employment. The program tutors and mentors high school students, as well as out-of-school youth and offers courses in website development, geographic information system mapping and administration. Also, Hopeworks Youth Healing Team offers training and consultation to schools and nonprofits on working with traumatized youths and adults.

History
In 1999 members of three churches in north Camden, one of the most crime-ridden areas in the nation, came together and organized the Hopeworks program. The original concept was to offer training to high school dropouts. With startup grants from the Campbell Soup Company and the Society of Jesus, Hopeworks opened its doors to the first trainees in March 2000, and started its non-profit website design business.

In 2012, amidst a high drop-out rate in the program, Hopeworks became a certified Sanctuary organization with a "trauma" framework. This greatly improved the retention rate. It has shared this lesson with others in Camden, bringing in national speakers for trauma summits. Representatives from at least a dozen groups meet regularly to discuss trauma-informed care, including the Camden County Police and the Camden Coalition of Healthcare Providers.

Programs
The Day training program for out-of-school youths offers technology training and job opportunities. It offers training in web design and GIS, along with literacy help and personal counseling or "formation," in which all the youths must participate. Typically after 3 months the youths have the skills to work for Hopeworks and to be admitted to entry-level college courses. They may continue to work and train at Hopeworks as long as they are continuing their college education. At the conclusion of training, trainees are invited to join the Hopeworks Corporate Internship Program, which has offered part-time, paying internships with a variety of local businesses and organizations.

Awards
Hopework's tutoring program has assisted almost 3,000 Camden youths to earn a high school diploma and 200 have gone on to college. In 2015 Hopeworks was named the Non-Profit of the Year by the Greater Philadelphia Chamber of Commerce, to go with numerous other awards that Putthoff and Hopeworks have received. Perhaps the biggest thrill for the youths at Hopeworks, and indicative of its wide reputation, was a visit by Tiger Woods.

References  

Jesuit development centres
Non-profit organizations based in New Jersey
Camden, New Jersey
Organizations established in 2000
2000 establishments in New Jersey
Development charities based in the United States
Social welfare charities based in the United States